Pennsylvania State Senate District 35 includes part of Centre County and all of Cambria County and Clearfield County. It is currently represented by Republican Wayne Langerholc.

District profile
The district includes the following areas:

All of Cambria County

Centre County:

All of Clearfield County

Senators

References

Pennsylvania Senate districts
Government of Bedford County, Pennsylvania
Government of Cambria County, Pennsylvania
Government of Clearfield County, Pennsylvania